Florence Danon-Gayda (born Florence Lansang Danon; October 16, 1928), better known as Rosa Rosal, is a FAMAS award-winning Filipina film actress dubbed as the "original femme fatale of Philippine cinema." She is also known for her work with the Philippine Red Cross (formerly Philippine National Red Cross). For her humanitarian activities, she received the 1999 Ramon Magsaysay Award for Public Service, an award widely considered as Asia's Nobel Prize.  She is the mother of TV host Toni Rose Gayda.

Early life
Rosal was born Florence Lansang Danon in Manila. Her mother Gloria Lansang hailed from Santa Rita, Pampanga, while her father Julio Danon was of French and Egyptian descent. Her half-brother, Don Danon, once acted as a stand-in for the Hollywood actor Rudolph Valentino.

During the Japanese occupation of the Philippines, Rosal worked as a newsreader in a Japanese-run radio station. Shortly after the end of the war, Rosal worked part-time at the San Lazaro Hospital. One night, she was passing by a film shooting as she was walking home, and she was spotted by the film's producer, Luis Nolasco. She was offered a film contract by Nolasco, who headed his own outfit, the Nolasco Brothers Studio.

Film career
The Nolasco Brothers Studio cast Rosal in Fort Santiago (1946). Her screen name was taken from the Tagalog words for "rose" and "gardenia." In 1947, Rosal was cast opposite Leopoldo Salcedo in Kamagong (1947). Her performance drew the attention of the other major film studios, and she was signed  to a contract with LVN Pictures by the studio head, Doña Sisang de Leon. She was cast by LVN Pictures in her first starring role in the 1949 film Biglang Yaman.

Throughout the 1950s, Rosal starred in costume dramas such as Prinsipe Amante sa Rubitanya (1951), and in such neo-realist dramas as Lamberto Avellana's Anak Dalita (1956) and Badjao (1956), both co-starring with Tony Santos Sr., and Manuel Silos's Biyaya ng Lupa (1959), which she cited as the best film she has ever made. For her role in Anak Dalita, Rosal received a citation from President Ramon Magsaysay. She was named FAMAS Best Actress in 1955 for Sonny Boy, and was nominated three other times, for Dagohoy (1953), Biyaya ng Lupa, and Ang Lahat ng Ito Pati na ang Langit (1989).

Notwithstanding her serious roles, Rosal would become best known in the 1950s for her daring appearances in film. She had no qualms appearing onscreen in bathing suits, engaging in kissing scenes or in playing villainous roles. Offscreen, Rosal led a quiet and private life. She enrolled in night classes at the Cosmopolitan Colleges and obtained a degree in Business Administration in 1954. She was married briefly in 1957 to an American pilot, Walter Gayda, with whom she had a child, Toni Rose, who later became a television host.

In the 1960s, Rosal became one of the first leading Filipino actors to appear regularly on television. She was a fixture on Cecille Guidote Alvarez's dramatic series Balintataw on ABC-5 (now TV5). In the 1970s, Rosal starred in Iyan ang Misis Ko, a family-oriented sitcom with Ronald Remy. In 1976, Rosal would also appear in Behn Cervantes's Sakada, a film which was banned by the martial law government of President Ferdinand Marcos.

TV appearances
Damayan & Kapwa Ko Mahal Ko
two public service shows where people in need of assistance came to ask Rosa's help
Ulila (Forsaken) Rosa Rosal's weekly drama anthology over BBC-Channel 2 (1976–1980)
EPISODES:
"Anak Nila ang Anak Ko" ("Their Child Is My Child")
with her real life daughter Toni Rose Gayda, playing as her daughter, with Laura Hermosa and Augusto Victa
"Farida"
introducing Fanny Serano, with Caloy Pimentel, Rolly Papasin, Joey Galvez & Rafael Lucas
"Sa bawa't araw" (At the end of each day)
with Josephine Estrada, Mervyn Samson, Hero Bautista & Princess Punzalan
"Goodbye, House"
with Hero Bautista & Mervyn Samson
"Ampon" (Adopted Child)
with Gina Alajar & Earl Palma
"Dalawang Ina" (Two mothers)
with Fanny Serrano, Romnick Sarmenta & introducing Dennis Roldan
"Walang hanggan ang dilim ng gabi" (Endless Night)
with Fanny Serrano, Rolly Papasin, Romy Mallari & Charmie Benavidez
"Ang Kanilang Ama" (Their father)
with Fred Montilla, Diana Dean, Angelito, Herbert Bautista, Maila Gumila, and  Charmie Benavidez 
"Joselito"
with Michael Sandico, Lito Anzures, Estrella Kuenzler, Joey Galvez, Jose Villafranca and introducing Janice de Belen
"Bulag" (Blind)
with Lito Anzures
"May isang anak" (There was a daughter)
with Anita Linda & Charmie Benavidez
"Ako ba ay isang ina?" (Am I a mother?)
with Gina Alajar
"Best Actress"
with Pen Medina, Janice de Belen, Bella Flores, Angelito, Soxy Topacio 
"Dapit-hapon" (sunset)
with Eddie Infante, Dexter Doria, Charmie Benavidez, Jun Soller
"Marami ang landas ng Buhay" (There are many paths in life)
with Geraldine, Connie Angeles, Caloy Pimentel, Chona Castillo 
"Bantayog" (Statue)
with Jose Villafranca, Romeo Enriquez and Chona Castillo

Humanitarian activities
Rosal joined the Philippine National Red Cross as a volunteer-member of its Blood Program in 1950, and was elected to its Board of Governors in 1965. Rosal has become widely known for her efforts to promote blood donation in the Philippines. She helped initiate Red Cross programs that set up bloodletting sessions inside campuses and military camps, including the American military base at Clark. She lobbied political leaders and foreign embassies for donations to upgrade Red Cross facilities.

Rosal also established a Women's Crisis love within the Philippine National Red Cross. The love  was aimed at assisting unwed and needy pregnant mothers, as well as finding homes for unwanted children. With donations obtained from the pork barrel funds of members of Congress, Rosal has also run in her personal capacity a college scholarship fund for poor but deserving students.

Rosal has also hosted two public-service television programs, Damayan and Kapwa Ko Mahal Ko, which solicit financial and medical aid for indigent medical patients.

Despite her widespread association with blood donation, Rosal has never donated blood herself, on account of her blood pressure, which is way below the level required for donors.

Honors
In 1999, Rosa was awarded the Ramon Magsaysay Award for Public Service. She was cited for "her lifetime of unstinting voluntary service, inspiring Filipinos to put the needs of others before their own."

In 2006, President Gloria Macapagal Arroyo bestowed on Rosal the Order of the Golden Heart with the rank of Grand Cross for a lifetime in public service and for her work with the Red Cross.

In the 1950s, while in her mid-twenties, Rosal declined President Ramon Magsaysay's offer to appoint her as head of the Social Welfare Administration, the predecessor-agency of the cabinet-level Department of Social Welfare and Development.

In November 2008, Rosal was awarded the Ading Fernando Lifetime Achievement Award at the 22nd PMPC Star Awards For TV.

Notes

References

External links

1928 births
Living people
20th-century Filipino actresses
Actresses from Manila
Filipino child actresses
Filipino people of Egyptian descent
Filipino people of French descent
Red Cross personnel
Ramon Magsaysay Award winners